The Smile of the Child is a voluntary, non-profit child welfare organization based in Athens, Greece.

Establishment 
In December 1995, a large number of the Greek public watched the TV show Red Card, which featured the 18th-month struggle of 10-year-old Andreas Giannopoulos, who was fighting to stay alive after a very serious health issue. This provided the impetus for the creation of The Smile of the Child.  In January 1996, The Smile of the Child was registered as a non-profit, non-governmental organisation . The Association continues to expand to meet the serious problems of children in-need living in Greece.

Activities 
The Smile of the Child organises Bazaars, Concerts, cultural and sports events aiming to assist children in need and their families.

Funds 
The organisation is supported financially mainly by a number of companies in Greece and elsewhere. The Hellenic Police and Elpida (Hope) are two such organizations that have supported The Smile of the Child.

International partners 
The Smile of the Child collaborates with international organizations such as the International Centre for Missing & Exploited Children (ICMEC), the European Federation for Missing and Exploited Children, Child Help Online, the European Federation for Street Children, and the US's  National Center for Missing and Exploited Children.

As of October 2010, The Southeastern European Centre for Missing and Exploited Children was inaugurated, as a joint initiative of ICMEC and The Smile of the Child.

See also 
 ActionAid

References

External links 
 Official Website  - 

1995 establishments in Greece
Child-related organizations in Greece
Organizations established in 1995